Erwin Simon (24 September 1908 – 20 September 1959) was a German swimmer. He competed in the men's 100 metre backstroke at the 1936 Summer Olympics.

References

External links
 

1908 births
1959 deaths
German male swimmers
Olympic swimmers of Germany
Swimmers at the 1936 Summer Olympics
People from Gladbeck
Sportspeople from Münster (region)